Abdul Hakeem Baloch is a Pakistani politician who has been a member of National Assembly of Pakistan since October 2022. He also served as MNA from 2013 to 2016 and again from 2016 to 2018.

Education
He has done bachelors.

Political career

He began his political career with Pakistan Peoples Party and served as a provincial minister of Sindh.

He was elected to the National Assembly of Pakistan from NA-258 (Karachi-XX) on ticket of Pakistan Muslim League (N) in 2013 Pakistani general election.

In 2013, he was made the Minister of State for Railways before being appointed as Minister of State for Communication in the Cabinet of Prime Minister Nawaz Sharif.

In 2016, he quit PML-N and rejoined Pakistan Peoples Party and resigned from the National Assembly seat that he won on PML-N ticket.

He ran for the seat of National Assembly from NA-258 (Karachi-XX) on ticket of PPP in by-election held in 2016 and retained the seat. He was given cabinet portfolio of Minister of State for Railways.

He ran for the NA-237 Malir seat on the ticket of Pakistan Peoples Party in the by-election held in October 2022 and won the elections by getting 32567 votes.

References

Pakistan People's Party politicians
Living people
Politicians from Karachi
Year of birth missing (living people)
Baloch people
Pakistani MNAs 2013–2018